Her Campus is an online magazine targeted at the female college student demographic. Content in the magazine is written by more than 7,000 contributors from more than 400 campus chapters  located in nine countries. The magazine was founded in 2009 by three Harvard University undergraduates: Stephanie Kaplan, Windsor Hanger Western, and Annie Wang. The women met in 2007 while working on a separate Harvard online publication. In November 2010, Glamour Magazine honored the women at its Women of the Year Awards ceremony, where they were presented with the Amazing Young Women Award from Chelsea Clinton.

Historical background
In January 2009, Kaplan, Hanger, and Wang entered the i3 Innovation Challenge sponsored by Harvard Student Agencies, the Technology and Entrepreneurship Center at Harvard, and the Harvard College Forum. The Challenge develops, showcases, and rewards innovative business ventures presented by students. The team of women proposed a national online magazine for college women, with student branches at colleges and universities across the United States. After their business plan and proposal received the Harvard Student Agencies Investment Award, they launched Her Campus magazine. The award secured national attention, along with financial assistance and free office space.

Business overview
The website was launched in September 2009. The online magazine runs feature articles targeted toward college survival. Hanger Western serves the magazine as the president and publisher, while Kaplan Lewis functions as the CEO and editor-in-chief. Wang rounds out the trio, functioning in the role of Chief Technology Officer and creative director. Her Campus Media is still 100% women-owned and run.

In addition to the online content, the magazine is represented by students at over 380 college campuses in multiple countries, including the U.S., Canada, Jamaica, the UK, Japan, and Australia. These campuses are known as My Campus chapters, or subdivisions of the magazine. Each branch has one or two campus correspondents that serve as president and editor-in-chief. These correspondents represent the magazine and oversee magazine content, developing featured articles and photos specific to their particular university. The correspondents also recruit fellow student journalists and publicize the website.

By the year 2018, Her Campus had spread even further across international borders. There are now "My Campus" chapters in South Africa, Puerto Rico, Nigeria, Ireland, India and Quebec, in addition to the international chapters that had already been established.

Support from influential individuals include board member Cathryn Cronin Cranston, publisher of the Columbia Journalism Review. Additionally, Joanna Coles, U.S. editor-in-chief of Cosmopolitan, serves as a mentor. These partnerships have allowed Her Campus writers to share their articles with Seventeen Magazine and The Huffington Post.

In 2018, Her Campus Media was named to the Forbes Magazine "30 under 30" list under the media category.

In May 2019, Her Campus Media acquired the Lala Media Group, Inc., and in August 2019, Her Campus Media acquired College Fashionista

Public relations
In addition to the online magazine, Her Campus Media LLC, the owner and operator of Her Campus, functions as a marketing and public relations firm. The firm works with commercial businesses and organizations that are interested in reaching college markets. Marketing packages that have been offered include sponsorships in various sections of the magazine, supporting advertisement campaigns, offering give-away promotions, and providing new-product distribution on branch campuses nationwide. Clients have included New Balance, Rent the Runway, and Juicy Couture. Overall, the firm reports over 100,000 hits daily, with a steadily growing readership.

Since the initial launch, Her Campus has been featured or mentioned in newspapers and magazines throughout the United States, including by The New York Times, Yahoo Finance, CNN Money, AOL Money College, CBS MoneyWatch, The Boston Globe, U.S. News & World Report, Seventeen Magazine, Business Insider, ABC News Now, and the FOX network affiliate in Boston.

Her Conference
Her Conference is an annual summer conference by Her Campus Media that is held in New York City and once held in Los Angeles, in 2019. The conference was launched in 2012 and focuses on teaching female college students more about marketing, journalism, and the media. The conference gives students and recent graduates the opportunity to hear from speakers who provide advice on careers and career development. Past keynote speakers include Jason Waganheim, the publisher and chief revenue officer of Teen Vogue, and Chandra Turner, the executive editor of Parents magazine as well as U.S. Ambassador to the UN Samantha Power, actress Aja Naomi King, the co-founders of The Women's March, actress Troian Bellisario, Journalist Gretchen Carlson, Fashion Designer Rebecca Minkoff, Olympic Champion Nastia Liukin, ESSENCE Editor-in-Chief Vanessa De Luca, SELF Editor-in-Chief Joyce Chang and ABC's The Bachelorette Andi Dorfman.

College Fashion Week 
College Fashion Week is an annual fall event by Her Campus Media that takes place in Boston and New York City. The event was first launched in 2013 and provides a VIP fashion week experience to college fashionistas while showcasing fall's must-have trends. Members of different chapters meet and network as well.  Attendees are given gift bags and free pampering from sponsors. Past sponsors of College Fashion Week include Primark, Ulta Beauty, Acuvue®, PopSugar, and StudentUniverse.

Her Campus Chapter Network 
The Her Campus Chapter Network consists of more than 380 chapters across the world, with more than 7,500 chapter members. These chapters are launched at colleges and universities and led by college students, referred to as Campus Correspondents. The Her Campus Chapter Network helps students learn how to conceptualize and publish editorial content, manage social media, publicize their organization and host events, as well as enable them to develop career skills and become part of a community.

InfluenceHer Collective 
InfluenceHer Collective is a network of blogs and vlogs written by young women on fashion, cooking, beauty, fitness, design, lifestyle and more.  More than 4,000 influencers can receive editorial and sponsorship opportunities from Her Campus and its partners through the Collective. Once influencers are accepted into the Collective, they gain access to exclusive benefits and resources and are able to share ideas, inspiration and support within the community.

References

Further reading

External links
 

Online magazines published in the United States
Student magazines published in the United States
Harvard University
Magazines established in 2009